Lloyd Robertson  (born January 19, 1934) is a Canadian journalist and former news anchor who is special correspondent on CTV's weekly magazine series, W5. Robertson served as the chief anchor and senior editor of CTV's national evening newscast, CTV News with Lloyd Robertson, until September 2011, when he retired from the CTV National News team. He co-hosted W5 from 2011 to 2016.

Robertson has covered many major events throughout his career, including the 1967 opening of Expo 67 in Montreal, the 1969 Moon landing (along with Percy Saltzman), many Olympic Games, Terry Fox's Marathon of Hope, the patriation of the Constitution of Canada, both the 1980 Quebec referendum and the 1995 Quebec referendum on separation from Canada, many federal elections, the death of Diana, Princess of Wales, the September 11 attacks in 2001, and the power outage crisis on both sides of the border of August 14, 2003.

On the scene, he has covered the construction of the Berlin Wall, the deaths of four former Canadian prime ministers, the elections of nearly half of Canada's prime ministers, state funerals, and royal, papal, and U.S. presidential visits. His name was also the basis for the satirical news anchor character Floyd Robertson, portrayed by Joe Flaherty on the Canadian TV comedy series SCTV.

Early life
Robertson was born in Stratford, Ontario, the son of Lillie Francis and George Henderson Robertson. His father had eight children with his first wife; after she died, he remarried and had two sons, Gordon and Lloyd; Lloyd was the youngest child. Robertson's father worked for the Canadian Pacific Railway, while his mother was a housewife. His father was of Scottish descent, while his mother emigrated from England.

Robertson had a somewhat rough childhood; his mother suffered from mental-health problems which eventually resulted in her undergoing a prefrontal lobotomy, while his father, who was 60 at the time of Robertson's birth, frequently battled cancer and died when Robertson was 21. During his childhood, Robertson was also frequently cared for by his half-siblings, especially his twin siblings Irvin and Ethel.

He first became interested in broadcasting when he was 12 years old, watching soldiers from The Perth Regiment marching home from World War II, and heard the commentators from CJCS talking about it. According to Robertson, "I realized I was in the centre of something very important...something much bigger than myself."

Broadcasting career

Radio
Robertson started his broadcasting career in 1952 at CJCS radio. He started working after school on Saturdays as an operator, spinning 78 rpm records, and read the news at midnight before he signed off.

Robertson completed high school and continued to work at CJCS until he moved to CJOY in Guelph in 1954.

CBC
On the advice of one of his colleagues in Guelph, he auditioned to work at the Canadian Broadcasting Corporation (CBC). After his audition was over, Robertson thought, "I'm never going to see this building again." Despite this, he got hired by the CBC, thanks to his bass voice.

Robertson applied for CBWT-TV in Winnipeg, Manitoba in 1956, his first-ever TV job. He mostly did local television until December 25, 1956, which was his first national broadcast.

After four years in Winnipeg, Robertson auditioned for CBOT-TV in Ottawa, Ontario. After two years, he moved to Toronto to host CBC Weekend in the late 1960s, and later anchor of The National from 1970 to 1976, before joining the CTV Television Network in October that year.  One of the reasons he left the CBC was his frustration at union regulations which confined news anchors to the role of announcer — prohibiting them from writing their own scripts or participating in editorial decisions concerning the news broadcast.

CTV
From 1976 to 1984, Robertson co-anchored the CTV National News with Harvey Kirck. When Kirck retired from the anchor desk in 1984, Robertson became the senior news anchor for CTV. Since 2004, Robertson has also served as one of the hosts of CTV's current affairs program W5, alternating with CTV's lead weekend anchor Sandie Rinaldo.

Robertson's signature sign-off of each news broadcast is, "And that's the kind of day it's been."

In February 2010, Robertson denied rumours of his impending retirement as a "work of fiction" during an appearance on Vancouver talk radio station CKNW. However, on the CTV National News broadcast of July 8, 2010, Robertson officially announced he would be leaving the anchor chair in the latter half of 2011 (although he did not say a specific date at the time, his last newscast was later announced to air on September 1, 2011). He has stated that he will continue on in various capacities at the network and in public life  including being host of W5.

On September 1, 2011, after 41 years as a national news anchor at both the CBC and CTV, Robertson anchored CTV News for the last time. The newscast concluded with him reminiscing about the stories he covered, such as natural disasters and royal weddings, while calling his news anchor run a rare privilege to have "a front row seat to history." He also thanked his audience watching and supporting him over the years.

In 2020, he narrated a portion of the 8th Canadian Screen Awards.

Personal life

Robertson married his high school sweetheart, Nancy Barrett, in July 1956. They have four daughters (Lisa, Nanci, Susan, and Lynda) and seven grandchildren.

On March 29, 2018, Robertson was involved in a multi-vehicle traffic accident on the Don Valley Parkway. He was uninjured.

TV longevity records
Robertson outlasted Kirck, the late Walter Cronkite, Dan Rather, Bob Schieffer, Tom Brokaw, and the late Peter Jennings to become the longest-serving network news anchor in television history; he is also one of the longest-serving news anchors on English-language North American television (network or local) along with KTRK-TV (Houston)'s Dave Ward, WNBC (New York)'s Chuck Scarborough, WPVI (Philadelphia)'s Jim Gardner, and KING-TV (Seattle)'s Jean Enersen.

Robertson, who was 77 years old at the time of his retirement from the CTV News team, also holds the record of being the oldest TV news anchor in network television and the oldest news anchor in Canada.

Honours

TV Times Reader's Choice Awards, Canada's Favourite News Anchor – 1998 and 1999
Officer of the Order of Canada, 1998
Gemini Award, "Best Host, Anchor, or Interviewer" – 1992, 1994, 1997
Scot of the Year Award, The Scottish Studies Society, 1995
1994 Winner of the Toronto Star Reader's Voice Award for Favourite TV Anchor
Honorary chairperson, 1992 Terry Fox Run
Honorary Doctor of Laws (LL.D) awarded by Royal Roads University – November 3, 2006
Received a star on Canada's Walk of Fame in 2007.
Honorary (Doctor of Laws) (LL.D) awarded by Brandon University – May 31, 2013 – https://www.brandonu.ca/news/2013/04/25/3481/

References

External links
 CTV News Lloyd Robertson biography
 Canadian Communications Foundation biography, photo and video
 

1934 births
20th-century Canadian non-fiction writers
20th-century Canadian male writers
21st-century Canadian non-fiction writers
Canadian people of Scottish descent
Canadian people of English descent
Canadian Presbyterians
Canadian television news anchors
Canadian television reporters and correspondents
Canadian television talk show hosts
CBC Television people
CTV Television Network people
Living people
Officers of the Order of Canada
People from Stratford, Ontario
Writers from Ontario
20th-century Canadian journalists
21st-century Canadian journalists
Canadian male non-fiction writers
Canadian Screen Award winning journalists